The 1998 New Hampshire gubernatorial election took place on November 3, 1998. Incumbent Governor Jeanne Shaheen won re-election. She defeated Jay Lucas, who had defeated Jim Rubens and Emile Beaulieu for the Republican nomination.

Election results

References

See also

New Hampshire
1998
Gubernatorial